PT-8 or variant, may refer to:
 Sukhoi PT-8, a 1950s prototype Soviet fighter-aircraft
 Consolidated XPT-8 and  XPT-8A, 1930s experimental training aircraft powered by Packard DR-980 diesel engines
 PT-8, a pre-World War II US Navy PT-boat.
 PT-8, a videocall standard used exclusively by the Nokia 6630